Laurie McKinnon (born January 4, 1960) is an associate justice of the Montana Supreme Court. She was elected to her first eight-year term in 2012.

Background
McKinnon was born January 4, 1960, in Baltimore, Maryland. She attended Goucher College and received her undergraduate degree in 1982. She attended the University of Baltimore School of Law and received her Juris Doctor in 1986. She began practicing law in 1987 as a prosecutor in Baltimore for the State's Attorney's Office. After that she started her own practice handling both civil and criminal litigation. In 1995 she moved to Cut Bank, Montana and later became a Deputy County Attorney for Glacier (1997-2000) and Teton County (2001-2006). McKinnon won the election in 2006 and became judge of the 9th Montana District Court, which is Teton, Toole, Pondera, and Glacier counties, in 2007. In 2010 McKinnon was awarded Judge of the year by the Court Appointed Special Advocates (CASA) of Montana for her work in cases involving abused and neglected children. In 2011, she received a grant from the United States Department of Justice to implement a drug court within the 9th Montana District Court.

In 2012, McKinnon ran for and in November of that year was elected to the Montana Supreme Court. She was sworn in to start her eight-year term in January 2013.

References

External links

	

1960 births
Living people
Goucher College alumni
Justices of the Montana Supreme Court
University of Baltimore School of Law alumni
Place of birth missing (living people)
Lawyers from Baltimore
20th-century American lawyers
21st-century American judges
21st-century American women judges
20th-century American women